The Czechoslovakia women's national under-18 and under-19 basketball team was the women's basketball side that represented Czechoslovakia in international under-18 and under-19 competitions. After the country was peacefully dissolved in 1993, the team was succeeded by separate Czech and Slovak teams.

See also 
 Czechoslovakia national basketball team
 Czechoslovakia women's national basketball team

References

External links 
 (en) Czechoslovakia, archive.fiba.com

Basketball in Czechoslovakia
Former national basketball teams
Women's national under-19 basketball teams
W